Melnyk is a Canadian electronic music producer who lives and works in London, England.

Career
Jeff 'Melnyk' co-runs the independent record label Gaymonkey Records. His debut album Silence received worldwide critical acclaim and fans such as the Pet Shop Boys approached Melnyk as a result to remix their hit single I'm With Stupid.

Melnyk has also collaborated extensively with UK pop band Temposhark. Melnyk has remixed a number of songs for Temposhark including their cult hit Joy. In June 2007, Melnyk released a remix album called Silence Remixed which featured a Temposhark remix of Melnyk's song Me and My Muse featuring the additional vocals of lead singer Robert Diament. In 2008, Temposhark's singer appeared on Melnyk's second album Revolutions on a track called Hurricane which was inspired by the Temposhark song Knock Me Out.

Melnyk has also produced four tracks for Louie Austen's 2006 album Iguana.

Discography

Albums
Silence (2005)
Revolutions (2008)

Remix albums
Silence Remixed (2007)

Singles and EPs
 "Art of Seduction" (2004)
 "Strut" (2005)
 "Fabulous" (2005)
 "Silence Remixed Vol. One" (2006)
 "Sound of Falling" (2006)
 "Revolutions" (2008)
 "The Competition" (2009)

Remixes
 Sara Berg - "Nuclear Love" (2004)
 Sara Berg - "Fabulous" (2004)
 Sara Berg - "Another Night" (2005)
 Napsugar - "Blind" (2006)
 My Robot Friend - "America is Automatic" (2006)
 Pet Shop Boys - "I'm With Stupid" (2006)
 Ebb - "I'm All Made of Music" (2006)
 Temposhark - "Joy" (2006)
 Louie Austen - "Disco Dancer" (2006)
 Division Kent - "In the Headlights" (2009)
 Temposhark - "Bye Bye Baby" (2009)
 MaJiKer - "Wall of Sound" (2010)

References

External links
 Official site
 Melnyk Discography on Discogs

Musicians from Alberta
Canadian record producers
Club DJs
Living people
Remixers
Year of birth missing (living people)
Canadian people of Ukrainian descent
British people of Ukrainian descent
British people of Canadian descent
Canadian DJs
Place of birth missing (living people)
Electronic dance music DJs